Neil W. Levin is a Professor Emeritus of the Jewish Theological Seminary, and since 1993 has served as the Artistic Director of the Milken Archive of Jewish Music. A foremost scholar of Jewish music, Levin has studied the music of the Jewish experience from historical, musical, and ethnological perspectives. His areas of focus include comparative considerations of eastern and western spheres of Ashkenazi Jewry in terms of their sacred work, secular art, theatrical, and folk music, and the musical creativity and life of American Jewry. As a professor of Jewish music on the faculty of the Jewish Theological Seminary of America in New York since 1982, he teaches graduate courses on the history, development, and repertoire of synagogue music, cantorial art, Yiddish and Hebrew folksong, the music of modern Israel, and music of the Jewish-American experience. He has been a lecturer and presenter at university seminars and academic conferences throughout the United States, Europe, and Israel.

Biography

 From February to May 2017, Levin served as YIVO’s first Anne E. Leibowitz Visiting Professor-in-Residence in Music.

Awards

In 2004, in recognition of his program notes about the Russian Jewish composer, Joseph Achron, in the accompanying booklet to the Milken Archive CD devoted to Achron’s music, Levin was presented with the coveted Deems Taylor Award—the annual award given by the American Society of Composers and Publishers (A.S.C.A.P.) for the most original and informative liner notes to a commercially distributed recording.

References

Columbia University alumni
Jewish musicologists
Living people
20th-century Jewish theologians
21st-century Jewish theologians
20th-century American educators
21st-century American educators
Year of birth missing (living people)